Skokie School District 73½ is a grade school district in east central Skokie, Cook County, Illinois.

School District 73½ was created on August 15, 1930, from part of School District 73, giving 42% of the school funds to District 73½.  District 73½ immediately arranged for its children to attend school in District 69 with District 73½ paying tuition of $100.00 per student per year.  District 73½ then built a new school, the Cleveland Public School, dedicating it on November 24, 1931.  Cleveland School closed by 1986.

Oakview Junior High School, at 8000 East Prairie Road at the corner with Oakton Street, was dedicated on November 15, 1959.  It was renamed "Oliver McCracken Middle School", after the retiring district superintendent, on March 23, 1987.

The school at 8100 North Tripp Avenue at the corner with Keeney Street, opened in 1994, and was unofficially called simply "Tripp School" until it received the formal name "Elizabeth Meyer School", after an early pioneer, on May 26, 1999.

Schools
 Oliver McCracken Middle School (grades 6–8)
 John Middleton Elementary School (grades 1–5)
 Elizabeth Meyer School (preschool-kindergarten)

See also
 Niles Township High School District 219

References

External links
 
 Skokie School District 73 1/2 at the Illinois Digital Archives

1930 establishments in Illinois
School districts established in 1930
Education in Skokie, Illinois
School districts in Cook County, Illinois